Korbáčik (Slovak IPA: [korbaːt͡ʃik]), in Goral language kôroboce (IPA: [kuɔrbɔce]), is a type of semi-hard or medium hard string cheese. It originates from the Orava region of northern Slovakia and South Poland as well as many other Goralic Regions. It is made from smoked cheese interwoven into fine braids. The name roughly translates to "little whip" which refers to the pattern woven onto the strings.

Content 
There are two main variants of the Korbáčik; smoked and unsmoked. In addition to these, it is not uncommon to produce salty variants, as well as with garlic. The basis for the production is milk, either from cow or from sheep.

See also 
 List of smoked foods
 List of stretch-cured cheeses

References 

Slovak cheeses
Slovak cuisine
Smoked cheeses
Stretched-curd cheeses